Scott Fisher may refer to:
Scott Fisher (basketball) (born 1963), retired American-Australian basketball player and former head coach
Scott Fisher (technologist), professor at the University of Southern California
Scott R. Fisher, visual effects artist.

See also
Scott Fischer (disambiguation)